Omoku  is a town in Rivers State, Nigeria with a population of about 200,000 people. It Is located in the Northern part of the state, near the boundary with Delta State and Imo State.  It is the headquarters of Ogba/Egbema/Ndoni Local Government Area and one of the major cities of the Ogba people and Rivers State of Nigeria. It is also the capital seat of the Oba of Ogba land. The indigenes speak Ogba of the Igboid language family.

Oil companies which operate there include Shell Petroleum Development Company, Total Exploration & Production Nigeria and Nigerian Agip Oil Company.  The city's infrastructure has been improved with the construction of dual carriageway roads, a power generation plant and banks.

Omoku enjoys relatively stable power supply. But lately, the oil companies that provide these services free of charge face a lot of challenges in providing this service. This may not be unconnected to the rapid growth and unchecked development on this social service. Nigeria.

Sports 
Go Round F.C.The football club play in the top-flight Nigerian Premier League from 2018. its a football club based in Omoku, Rivers state, Nigeria. They play their home game at Krisdera Hotel Stadium. They are currently playing in the second tire of the Nigerian professional football league. The club is owned by Felix A. Obuah and coached by Ngozi Elechi.

Notable People

References

External links 
 Government Project Pictures

Towns in Rivers State